Trolls: The Beat Goes On! is an American animated streaming television series produced by DreamWorks Animation. The show, based on the 3D computer-animated comedy musical film Trolls, was released on Netflix on January 19, 2018, exclusively in the United States, Canada, Latin America, United Kingdom, Ireland, Australia, New Zealand, the Nordics, Benelux, and France. Amanda Leighton, Skylar Astin, Kari Wahlgren, Sam Lerner, David Kaye, David Fynn, Sean T. Krishnan, Kevin Michael Richardson, and Fryda Wolff provide the new voices for Princess Poppy, Branch, Bridget, King Gristle, King Peppy, Biggie and Mr. Dinkles, Guy Diamond, Smidge, DJ Suki and Satin & Chenille for this series respectively; only  Ron Funches and Walt Dohrn reprise their roles as Cooper and Cloud Guy, also respectively. Matt Lowe also voices Creek in the series, who returns in "Creek Week".

Hannah Friedman, Sam Friedman, and Matthew Beans developed the series, with music from Alex Geringas and original songs by Alana Da Fonseca. James Zahn of The Rock Father confirmed that there would be a second season, which was released on March 9 and consists of seven episodes.

The third season was released on August 24, 2018, the fourth season on November 2, 2018, the fifth season on January 18, 2019, the sixth season on April 9, 2019, the seventh season on August 27, 2019, and the eighth and final season was released on November 22, 2019.

A new Trolls series Trolls: TrollsTopia was released on Hulu on November 19, 2020. It was also released on Peacock on the same day.

Cast and characters

Main characters 
 Amanda Leighton as Queen Poppy, the sweet and optimistic Queen of the Trolls.
 Skylar Astin as Branch, an over-cautious, but good-hearted survivalist Troll and Poppy's best friend.
 David Fynn as:
 Biggie, a large, friendly Troll. 
 Mr. Dinkles, Biggie's pet worm.
 Fryda Wolff as:
 DJ Suki, a cheerful and positive Troll who uses DJ equipment made of insects.
 Satin and Chenille, twin fashionista Trolls who conjoined by their hair. Satin is very cheerful and talkative while Chenille is calm and sassy.
 Ron Funches as Cooper, a giraffe-like Troll.
 Sean T. Krishnan as Guy Diamond, a glittery, naked Troll with a highly auto-tuned voice.
 Kevin Michael Richardson as Smidge, a small, inordinately strong female Troll with a masculine voice.

Supporting characters 
 David Kaye as King Peppy, the former King of the Trolls and Poppy's father.
 Sam Lerner as King Gristle Jr., the King of the Bergens.
 Kari Wahlgren as:
 Bridget, a Bergen who is a former scullery maid, Gristle Jr's girlfriend, and Poppy's best friend.
 Harper, a very artistic, creative, sassy, jocund, competitive and optimistic Troll who loves to paint.
 Matt Lowe as Creek, a Troll with zen-like wisdom and Branch's treacherous rival.
 Gary Cole as Sky Toronto, the boss and owner of Sky Toronto's Party Shop.
 Declan Churchil Carter as Keith, a young Troll.
 Abby Ryder Fortson as Priscilla, a young Troll.
 Kyla Carter as CJ Suki, DJ Suki's young niece.
 Walt Dohrn as:
 Fuzzbert, a Troll whose legs are the only thing visible besides his hair.
 Cloud Guy, an anthropomorphic cloud who often makes fun of Branch.
 Sainty Nelsen as Nova Swift, a trendsetter and fashionista Troll.
 Jonah Platt as Milton Moss, a gentle critter keeper and veterinarian Troll who is Iris's older brother and Smidge's love interest.
 Fryda Wolff as:
 Dr. Moonbloom, a medical Troll who has a habit of saying things dramatically.
 Gia Grooves, a kind, glittery Troll who run the daycare center.
 Alexa Kahn as Tug Duluth, a tour guide Troll.
 Kevin Michael Richardson as:
 Klaus Von Frousting, a Troll who applies frosting.
 Groth, an upper class Bergen with high standards.
 Chad and Todd, the guards of the Royal Bergen family.
 Pat Pinney as Nangus, a Bergen who is in charge of the dungeon.
 Arnie Pantoja as Archer Pastry, a creature who was once part of a group called "The Party Crashers" and a new friend to Poppy and the Trolls. 
 Rachel Bloom as Cybil, a fortune teller troll

Episodes

Soundtrack

Songs

Broadcast 
The series was released internationally on Netflix. It was also released in the United States on Universal Kids, United Kingdom on Pop, Tiny Pop and Pop Max, in Australia on ABC Me, in Canada on Family, and in South Africa on e.tv.

The series was also released for broadcast in South Korea on Tooniverse. The main theme of the program, "Hair in the Air", is sung in its Korean version featuring vocals from Red Velvet's Yeri and NCT's Jeno, Jaemin, and Renjun.

Home media 
Trolls: The Beat Goes On! - Seasons 1 - 4, containing all of the episodes from seasons 1–4, was released on DVD on May 7, 2019, by Universal Pictures Home Entertainment.

References

External links 
  at DreamWorks TV
  at Netflix
 

2010s American animated television series
2010s American musical comedy television series
2018 American television series debuts
2019 American television series endings
American children's animated adventure television series
American children's animated comedy television series
American children's animated fantasy television series
American children's animated musical television series
Netflix children's programming
Animated television shows based on films
Television series by DreamWorks Animation
Television series by Universal Television
Trolls (franchise)
English-language Netflix original programming